Parrot Carrot is a children's book written by Kate Temple and Jolyon Temple. It is illustrated by Jon Foye. The book is published by Australia's largest independent publisher, Allen and Unwin. The book has also been produced as an app.  It is the world's first augmented reality children's book.  The interactive ebook is voiced by noted Australian singer Kamahl.

References

External links 
 
National Library of Australia record
Parrot Carrot page at Allen & Unwin

2011 children's books
2010s interactive fiction
Australian children's books
Australian picture books
Augmented reality applications
Books about birds
Allen & Unwin books